The Amazing Race 23 is the twenty-third season of the American reality television show The Amazing Race. It featured eleven teams of two competing in a race around the world.

The season premiered on CBS on September 29, 2013, and the two-hour season finale aired on December 8, 2013.

Dating couple Jason Case and Amy Diaz were the winners of this season, while exes Tim Sweeney and  finished in second place, and married doctors Travis and Nicole Jasper finished in third.

Production

Development and filming

The season was renewed on March 27, 2013. A revised opening credits sequence and on-screen clue graphics were developed for this season along with an updated map using 3D blue marble layout.

The Double Express Pass, introduced in the previous season, returned, where the first team to arrive at the pit stop on the first leg received two Express Passes: one for themselves and one to give to any other team.

Cast

The cast included former Houston Texans players Chester Pitts and Ephraim Salaam, the wives of baseball players Chris Getz of the Kansas City Royals and David DeJesus of the Tampa Bay Rays, a pair of LA Kings Ice Crew maintenance workers, former Miss Rhode Island USA beauty queen Amy Diaz, former Minor League Baseball player Tim Sweeney and former Lingerie Football player Marie Mazzocchi, and a pair of theater performers from the stage comedy The Queen of Bingo. Married emergency room doctors Travis and Nicole Jasper have also appeared on the docudrama series Untold Stories of the E.R.

Future appearances
While the season was still airing, Tim & Marie and Leo & Jamal were invited to appear on The Amazing Race: All-Stars. The former declined the invitation, but the latter participated. Leo & Jamal also returned for a third time on The Amazing Race: Reality Showdown.

On May 25, 2016, Leo & Jamal appeared on an Amazing Race-themed primetime special of The Price is Right. In 2022, Leo also competed on The Challenge: USA.

Results
The following teams are listed with their placements in each leg. Placements are listed in finishing order. 
A  placement with a dagger indicates that the team was eliminated. 
An  placement with a double-dagger indicates that the team was the last to arrive at a pit stop in a non-elimination leg, and had to perform a Speed Bump task in the following leg. 
An italicized and underlined placement indicates that the team was the last to arrive at a pit stop, but there was no rest period at the pit stop and all teams were instructed to continue racing. There was no required Speed Bump task in the next leg.
 A  indicates that the team used an Express Pass on that leg to bypass one of their tasks.
 A  indicates that the team used the U-Turn and a  indicates the team on the receiving end of the U-Turn.

Notes

Race summary

Leg 1 (United States → Chile)

Episode 1: "We're Not in Oklahoma No More" (September 29, 2013)
Prize: Two Express Passes (awarded to Tim & Marie; one for themselves and the other to be given to another team)
Eliminated: Hoskote & Naina
Locations
Santa Clarita, California (Melody Ranch Motion Picture Studio) (Starting Line)
 Los Angeles → Iquique, Chile
Alto Hospicio (Zona de Parapentes) 
Iquique (Muelle Prat ) 
Iquique (Teatro Municipal de Iquique ) 
Episode summary
At the Melody Ranch Motion Picture Studio, teams had to choose a vehicle and use the in-vehicle communication system to contact a man named Javier, who revealed their first destination: Iquique, Chile. Teams then drove to Los Angeles International Airport, where they booked one of two American Airlines flights to Iquique, the first of which had room for seven teams and arrived 2:30 hours before the second flight, which carried the remaining four teams. Once in Iquique, teams had to look for Javier at the Alto Hospicio in order to receive their next clue.
 In this season's first Roadblock, one team member had to direct their taxi to follow their partner, who paraglided from the Alto Hospicio down to either Playa Brava or Huayquique Beach. Once team members reunited on the beach, they received their next clue.
 In this leg's second Roadblock, the team member who paraglided in the previous Roadblock had to collect five fish from one of three boats, reaching them by rowboat, and then deliver the fish to a fishmonger in order to receive a postcard, which depicted their first pit stop. The three fishing boats each had a limited number of fish, so if a boat ran out of fish, racers had to find one of the other boats in order to get their remaining fish.
Teams checked in at the pit stop: the Teatro Municipal de Iquique.

Leg 2 (Chile)

Episode 2: "Zip It, Bingo" (October 6, 2013)
Prize: A trip for two to the Turks and Caicos Islands (awarded to Chester & Ephraim)
Eliminated: Rowan & Shane
Locations
Iquique (Teatro Municipal de Iquique ) 
Iquique (Museo Corbeta Esmeralda)
Tarapacá Region (Atacama Desert – Irlanda 3 Road Sign)
  Tarapacá Region (Atacama Desert – Mina de Sal Punta de Lobos) 
 Iquique → Santiago
Santiago (Plaza de Armas)
Santiago (Paseo Ahumada & Merced 738) 
San José de Maipo (Cascada de las Animas) 
Episode summary
At the beginning of this leg, teams had to find the Museo Corbeta Esmeralda, where they had to repeat to the officer on deck the famous quote uttered by Arturo Prat at the Battle of Iquique – "¡Al abordaje, muchachos!" – "Charge the ship, men!" – in order to receive their next clue. Teams then had to travel to the Irlanda 3 Road Sign in the Atacama Desert, where they found their next clue.
 This season's first Detour was a choice between Brining or Mining. Both Detour options required teams to bike to the salt mine in the Tarapacá salt flats. In Brining, teams had to carry bags of salt and dump them into a pool in order to reach neutral buoyancy. Once they were able to float on the surface, they could receive their next clue. In Mining, the teams had to use pickaxes and sledgehammers to open halite boulders until they found one that contained their next clue.
Teams were then instructed to travel by bus to Santiago. Once there, they had to make their way to the Plaza de Armas, where they found their next clue.
 In this leg's Roadblock, one team member had to take on the role of a lustrabota: a Chilean shoeshiner. After shining a customer's shoes, the racer had to properly put everything at their lustrabota station into the cart and transport it back to the storage depot in order to receive their next clue.
Teams had to check in at the pit stop: the Cascada de las Animas in San José de Maipo.
Additional notes
Promotional photos showed some teams riding a zip-line above the Maipo River at Cascada de las Animas before checking in at the pit stop. Once it was nighttime, teams could no longer ride the zip-line and simply checked in at the pit stop, which was also moved from the suspension bridge.

Leg 3 (Chile → Portugal)

Episode 3: "King Arthur Style" (October 13, 2013)
Prize: A trip for two to Costa Rica (awarded to Nicole & Travis)
Eliminated: Chester & Ephraim
Locations
San José de Maipo (Cascada de las Animas) 
 Santiago → Lisbon, Portugal
 Lisbon (Martim Moniz Square → Miradouro das Portas do Sol )
Lisbon (Museu Nacional dos Coches)
Lisbon (Fábrica Sant'Anna  Jerónimos Monastery & Padrão dos Descobrimentos)  
Lisbon (Parque Florestal de Monsanto – Clube Português de Tiro a Chumbo) 
Sintra (Castelo dos Mouros) 
Episode summary
At the beginning of this leg, teams were instructed to fly to Lisbon, Portugal. Once in Lisbon, teams had to travel to Martim Moniz Square, where they had to take a tram uphill to the Miradouro das Portas do Sol. Once there, they had to find Fado performers, who gave them their next clue: a painting of the Embassy Coach sent by King John V to Pope Clement XI. Teams had to figure out that the painting was directing them to the Museu Nacional dos Coches and that their next clue was near the depicted Embassy Coach.
 This leg's Detour was a choice between Tiles or Miles. In Tiles, teams had to correctly assemble a life-size tile puzzle in order to receive their next clue. In Miles, teams had to first retrieve a giant-sized compass from the Jerónimos Monastery and then use it to map out the distance traveled by Ferdinand Magellan on his circumnavigation of the globe on the large compass rose at the Padrão dos Descobrimentos. Once teams were within 500 nautical miles of the correct answer, they could receive their next clue.
After completing the Detour, teams had to travel to the Parque Florestal de Monsanto, where they found their next clue.
Once successful, a knight retrieved their shield which had their next clue on the back.
Teams had to check in at the pit stop: the Castelo dos Mouros in Sintra.
Additional notes
Chester & Ephraim did not arrive in Lisbon until long after all of the other teams had already checked in at the pit stop. Phil met them at the Lisbon Airport to inform them of their elimination.

Leg 4 (Portugal → Norway)

Episode 4: "Beards in the Wind" (October 20, 2013)
Prize:  each (awarded to Brandon & Adam)
Locations
Sintra (Castelo dos Mouros) 
 Lisbon → Bodø, Norway
 Bodø → Svolvær
Svolvær (L. Bergs Sønner A/S Fish Processor)  
 Svolvær → Henningsvær
Henningsvær (Henningsvær Bridge) 
Henningsvær (Rock Quarry)
Vestvågøy (Viking Longhouse) 
Episode summary
At the beginning of this leg, teams were instructed to fly to Bodø, Norway, located just north of the Arctic Circle. Once in Bodø, teams had to travel by ferry to Svolvær and search for their next clue.
 This leg's Detour was a choice between Hang Your Heads or Hammer of the Cods. In Hang Your Heads, teams had to string together six bundles of ten fish heads each. They then had to transport them by wheelbarrow to a drying rack and place them on a rod in order to receive their next clue.
After completing the Detour, teams had to travel in an RIB (rigid-hulled inflatable boat) to the Henningsvær fishing village, where they found their next clue.
 In this leg's Roadblock, one team member had to put on a wetsuit, jump off the Henningsvær Bridge, and swing on the end of an  rope. They then had to unclip, fall into the water, and swim to a buoy that held their next clue. Once they swam back to their partner, who was waiting in an RIB, they could return to shore.
After completing the Roadblock, teams had to properly hitch a granite boulder on a sled to a provided truck in a rock quarry. They then had to pull the sled far enough forward so as to reveal their next clue and a satchel of Viking coins underneath.
Teams had to check in at the pit stop: the Viking Longhouse in Vestvågøy.
Additional notes
There was no elimination at the end of this leg; all teams were instead instructed to continue racing.

Leg 5 (Norway → Poland)

Episode 5: "Get Our Groove On" (October 27, 2013)
Prize: A trip for two to Hawaii (awarded to Tim & Marie)
Eliminated: Brandon & Adam
Locations
 Svolvær → Trondheim
 Trondheim → Gdańsk, Poland
Gdańsk (Gdańsk Shipyard – Solidarity Square )
Gdańsk (Golden Gate)
Gdańsk (Long Market – Neptune's Fountain  Old Town Hall )  
Gdańsk (Motława Riverfront – Medieval Harbor Crane ) 
Gdańsk (Przymorze) 
Sopot (Sopot Pier) 
Episode summary
At the start of this leg, teams had to travel by overnight ferry to Trondheim and then fly to Gdańsk, Poland. Once in Gdańsk, teams had to search the grounds of Solidarity Square at the Gdańsk Shipyard, where they found their next clue.
 This leg's Detour was a choice between Pose or Polka. In Pose, teams had to dress up as Neptune, pose like his statute at the Neptune Fountain in front of the Gdańsk Town Hall, and solicit donations from passersby until they collected 75 zł (roughly US$) in order to receive their next clue. In Polka, teams had to don traditional Polish costumes and then perform a polka dance routine to the satisfaction of their dance instructor in order to receive their next clue. After completing either Detour, teams had to continue to wear their costumes for the remainder of the leg. 
After completing the Detour, teams had to search the Motława Riverfront for the foreman at the Medieval Harbor Crane in order to find their next clue.
Once they found the apartment serving rose hip jam-filled pączki (identified by a red center), they received their next clue. 
Teams had to check in at the pit stop: the Sopot Pier.
Additional notes
 This leg featured a Double U-Turn. Tim & Danny chose to use the U-Turn on Leo & Jamal, while Leo & Jamal chose to use the U-Turn on Brandon & Adam.
Tim & Marie used their Express Pass to bypass the Detour on this leg.

Leg 6 (Poland → Austria)

Episode 6: "Choir Boy at Heart" (November 3, 2013)
Prize: A trip for two to Anguilla (awarded to Nicole & Travis)
Eliminated: Tim & Danny
Locations
Sopot (Sopot Pier) 
 Gdańsk → Vienna, Austria
Vienna (Vienna State Opera) 
Vienna (Palais Lobkowitz – Austrian Theatre Museum) 
Vienna (Donauturm) 
Vienna (Palais Augarten)  
Vienna (Schönbrunn Palace – Irrgarten)
Vienna (Schönbrunn Palace – Gloriette) 
Episode summary
At the start of this leg, teams had to travel by overnight train to Vienna, Austria. Once in Vienna, teams traveled to the Vienna State Opera, where they met an actor dressed as Rigoletto, who escorted them to the opera house's costume department and then gave them their next clue.
 This leg's Detour was a choice between Light Brigade or Masquerade. In Light Brigade, teams would have traveled to the Ephesos Museum, dressed as court servants, and assembled an elaborate crystal chandelier to the satisfaction of the chamberlain in order to receive their next clue. In Masquerade, teams had to wear elaborately colored masks before joining a Viennese ball, where they had to search amongst waltzing couples for the pair wearing identical masks to their own in order to receive their next clue. All teams chose the Masquerade.  
 This season's only Fast Forward was a Switchback from season 4, where both team members would have had to perform a  bungee jump from the top of the Donauturm. However, the Fast Forward was unavailable due to high winds, and no teams chose to wait for more favorable weather.
 In this leg's Roadblock, one team member had to learn how to sing Franz Schubert's "Die Forelle" and then perform it with the Vienna Boys' Choir with correct German pronunciation and musicality in order to receive their next clue.
After completing the Roadblock, teams had to travel to Schönbrunn Palace, where they had to search the palace's garden hedge maze for their next clue, which directed them to the pit stop: the gloriette on the palace grounds.

Leg 7 (Austria → United Arab Emirates)

Episode 7: "Speed Dating Is the Worst" (November 10, 2013)
Prize: A trip for two to Paris, France (awarded to Leo & Jamal)
Locations
Vienna (Stadtpark) 
 Vienna → Abu Dhabi, United Arab Emirates
Abu Dhabi (Sheikh Zayed Mosque)
Abu Dhabi (Irani Souk – Jaber Khoory Household Appliances Company) 
Abu Dhabi (Abu Dhabi Vegetable Market  Dhow Harbor)  
 Abu Dhabi → Yas Island
Yas Island (Yas Viceroy Hotel Abu Dhabi & Yas Marina Circuit)  
Yas Island (Yas Marina Circuit – Champions' Podium) 
Episode summary
At the beginning of this leg, teams were instructed to fly to Abu Dhabi in the United Arab Emirates. Once there, teams had to enter the Sheikh Zayed Mosque in order to receive their next clue. Female racers had to don a traditional abaya before entering the mosque. Teams were then directed to find their next clue at the Jaber Khoory Household Appliances Company.
 This leg's Detour was a choice between Sort It Out or Sew It Up. In Sort It Out, teams had to search through several types of dates and prepare an elaborate tray that matched an example in order to receive their next clue. In Sew It Up, teams had to put together a traditional fishing net to the satisfaction of the fishing boat captain in order to receive their next clue.
After completing the Detour, teams had to travel to the Al Bandar Marina, where they had to board a marked yacht that departed every 15 minutes to Yas Island.
 In this leg's Roadblock, one team member dropped  from the top of the Yas Viceroy Hotel Abu Dhabi before rappelling down to the ground. They then got into a Le Mans Prototype race car and rode along on a lap of the Yas Marina Circuit. While in the car, racers had to look amongst signs on the track with drivers' names and times logged in the inaugural Abu Dhabi Grand Prix for the circuit record set by Sebastian Vettel. Once they told the pit crew chief the correct time and driver, he gave them their next clue. If they were incorrect, they had to make another lap around the track until they got the correct answer.
Teams had to check in at the pit stop: the champions' podium of the Yas Marina Circuit.
Additional notes
This was a non-elimination leg.

Leg 8 (United Arab Emirates)

Episode 8: "One Hot Camel" (November 17, 2013)
Prize: A choice of any two Ford EcoBoost vehicles (awarded to Nicole & Travis)
Eliminated: Nicky & Kim
Locations
Yas Island (Yas Marina Circuit) 
Yas Island (Yas Marina Circuit – Pit Row Garage 14)
Al Khatim Desert (Boudthib Endurance Village)
Al Ain (Al Ain Oasis)
Al Ain (Al Jahili Fort)  
Al Ain (Al Jahili Tower) 
Al Ain (Wadi Adventure)  
Al Ain (Jebel Hafeet – Mercure Grand Hotel) 
Episode summary
At the start of this leg, teams had to use the Viking coins they'd received in Norway to decipher a numeric code and unlock a vehicle, which they then drove the Boudthib Endurance Village in the Al Khatim Desert. There, teams had to use dune buggies to follow a marked course until they found the clue box containing their next clue.
At the Al Ain Oasis, teams had to search for their next clue, which was located at the top of one of several date palm trees. Teams had to ask for help from the local tree climbers in order to retrieve their clue.
 This leg's Detour was a choice between Wedding Guests or Beauty Contest. In Wedding Guests, teams had to prepare machbūs, a traditional Emirati dish for wedding guests. After gathering and preparing all of the necessary ingredients, teams had to put it into a large pot and then serve the finished dish to a wedding party in order to receive their next clue. In Beauty Contest, teams had find a camel that met a set of breed guidelines and then dress it for a camel show. If the judges were pleased with their camel selection, they awarded the teams their next clue. 
After completing the Detour, teams had to make their way to the Al Jahili Tower, where they found their next clue.
 In this leg's Roadblock, one team member had to ride down the largest man-made river rapids in the world and collect red, green, and black flags in order to receive their next clue.
Teams had to check in at the pit stop: the Mercure Grand Hotel in Al Ain.
Additional notes
 This leg featured a Double U-Turn. Nicole & Travis chose to use the U-Turn on Leo & Jamal, while Tim & Marie chose to use the U-Turn on Nicky & Kim.
Nicole & Travis used their Express Pass to bypass the Detour on this leg.

Leg 9 (United Arab Emirates → Indonesia)

Episode 9: "Part Like the Red Sea" (November 24, 2013)
Prize:  each (awarded to Leo & Jamal)
Eliminated: Ally & Ashley
Locations
Yas Island (Yas Viceroy Hotel Abu Dhabi) 
 Abu Dhabi → Bandung, Indonesia
Cileunyi (Cikandang Village Ram Arena)
 Rancaekek → Bandung
Bandung (Simpang Dago Market & Bandung Zoo  Sukahaji Bird Market & Sumber Sari Arena)  
Padasuka (Saung Angklung Udjo ) 
Lembang (Bosscha Observatory) 
Episode summary
At the beginning of this leg, teams were instructed to fly to Bandung, Indonesia, on the island of Java. Once there, teams had to travel to Cileunyi, pick up two Priangan rams, and take them to the ram arena so they could participate in a traditional West Javanese ram fight. Once the rams butted heads, teams had to load them back on their trucks in order to receive their next clue, which instructed them to travel by train back to Bandung and search inside the train station for their next clue.
 This leg's Detour was a choice between For the Elephants or For the Birds. In For the Elephants, teams visited the Simpang Dago Market, where they had to pick up watermelons, bananas, sweet potatoes, and sugar cane before taking everything to the Bandung Zoo. Once there, they had to transport the food to the elephant enclosure where they fed the elephants and received their next clue. In For The Birds, teams picked up two matching rosy-faced lovebirds at the Sukahaji Bird Market and then took them to a bird song grand prix at the Sumber Sari Arena. After entering the birds into the competition, teams had to get their birds to sing. Once they were scored, the judge awarded them their next clue.
 In this leg's Roadblock, one team member had to properly assemble an angklung: a traditional Indonesian musical instrument made of bamboo. Once they assembled the stand correctly, put all eight notes in order, and could play a complete octave, they received their next clue.
Teams had to check in at the pit stop: the Bosscha Observatory in Lembang.

Leg 10 (Indonesia)

Episode 10: "Cobra in My Teeth" (December 1, 2013)
Prize: A trip for two to Cancún, Mexico (awarded to Jason & Amy)
Locations
Lembang (Bosscha Observatory) 
Parongpong (Ciwangun Indah Camp – King Cobra House)
Subang (Tangkuban Perahu Volcano – Kawah Domas Crater) 
Subang (Gracia Spa Graha Ciater  Ciater Tea Plantation )  
Cisarua (Curug Cimahi ) 
Episode summary
At the beginning of this leg, teams had to travel to the King Cobra House, where both team members had to eat a  portion of grilled cobra meat in order to receive their next clue.
 In this leg's Roadblock, one team member picked up sixty eggs from a food stand and then took an eight-minute moped taxi ride into the Kawah Domas crater of Tangkuban Perahu, where they used one of the volcanic hot springs to boil the eggs. After returning to the stand with the eggs, an egg-spert sliced open each egg to see if they were sufficiently boiled. Once they had a dozen hard-boiled eggs, teams received their next clue.
 This leg's Detour was a choice between Paint Your Partner or Turn Over a New Leaf. In Paint Your Partner, teams went to the Gracia Spa Graha Ciater, where they had to make each other up in traditional Javanese bridal makeup without the use of a mirror. Once the beautician was satisfied with their work, teams received their next clue. In Turn Over a New Leaf, teams traveled to a tea plantation in Ciater and dressed as traditional tea harvesters. They then had to search the plantation for a pair of clipping shears hidden in the plants, which they could trade for their next clue.
Teams had to had to climb down 587 steps to reach the Curug Cimahi and check in at the pit stop.
Additional notes
This was a non-elimination leg.

Leg 11 (Indonesia → Japan) 

Episode 11: "Amazing Crazy Race" (December 8, 2013)
Prize: A trip for two to Aruba (awarded to Tim & Marie)
Eliminated: Leo & Jamal
Locations
Bandung (Sheraton Bandung) 
 Bandung → Tokyo, Japan
Tokyo (Setagaya – Gotokuji Temple)
Tokyo (Setagaya – Tokyo Media City   Kinuta Park) 
Tokyo (Shinjuku – Shinjuku Central Park)  
Tokyo (Shibuya – Shibuya Scramble Crossing)
Tokyo (Shibuya – Konnō Hachimangū Shrine ) 
Episode summary
At the beginning of this leg, teams were instructed to fly to Tokyo, Japan. Once in Tokyo, teams had to travel to the Gotokuji Temple in order to find their next clue.
 This season's final Detour was a choice between Knock It Down or Call It Up. In Knock It Down, teams had to pick up four large pins outside Tokyo Media City studios and then participate in a human bowling game show, with team members alternating slides down an incline on an inner tube into a set of pins. Once teams scored a strike, they received their next clue. In Call It Up, one racer had to put on a swimsuit, jump into an art installation using one of Tokyo's obsolete telephone booths filled with water and goldfish, dial a provided telephone number, and then listen to the provided message: "Welcome to Tokyo. Wasabi taberu." They then had to repeat the message to their partner, who had to correctly relay the message to a judge in order to receive their next clue.
 For their Speed Bump, Leo & Jamal had to join a group of zookeepers in an rhinoceros drill and help capture an escaped "rhinoceros" before they could continue racing.
 In this leg's Roadblock, one team member had to assemble a "robot" using a set of cardboard pipes with only a miniature model as a guide in order to receive their next clue.
After completing the Roadblock, teams had to search the Shibuya Scramble Crossing for a roaming "vending machine" that held their next clue, which directed them to the pit stop: the Konnō Hachimangū Shrine in Tokyo.

Leg 12 (Japan → United States)

Episode 11: "Amazing Crazy Race" (December 8, 2013)
Winners: Jason & Amy
Second Place: Tim & Marie
Third Place: Nicole & Travis
Locations
Tokyo (Shinjuku – Shinjuku Central Park) 
 Tokyo → Juneau, Alaska
 Juneau (Douglas → Grizzly Bar) 
 Juneau (Grizzly Bar) → Taku Inlet – (Norris Glacier)
 Taku Inlet (Norris Glacier → "Marked Island")
 Taku Inlet ("Marked Island") → Juneau
Juneau (Douglas Island – Blueberry Hills Trailhead)
Juneau (End of North Douglas Highway – Outer Point Trail) 
Episode summary
At the beginning of this leg, teams were instructed to fly to Juneau, Alaska. Once in Juneau, teams had to travel by boat to Grizzly Bar, where they found their next clue.
After completing the Roadblock, teams took a helicopter to Norris Glacier, where they chose a mountain guide to help them reach the face of the glacier, crossing a crevasse and going through an ice tunnel along the way. They then had to use a pickaxe to dig out their next clue, which was frozen inside a glacier amongst numerous false clues. Teams then paddled kayaks to an island where they found their next clue, and then returned to Juneau in a helicopter.
At Blueberry Hills Trailhead, teams had to assemble a wall of totem poles that spelled out the names of the currencies used in the countries they visited in chronological order. Once teams had the right currencies in the right order, they were given their final clue, which directed them to the finish line: the Outer Point Trail at the end of the North Douglas Highway.
{| class="wikitable unsortable" style="text-align:center;"
! scope="col" |Country
! scope="col" |Currency
|-
! scope="row" |Chile
| Peso
|- 
! scope="row" |Portugal
| Euro
|- 
! scope="row" |Norway
| Krone
|- 
! scope="row" |Poland
| Złoty
|- 
! scope="row" |Austria
| Euro
|-
! scope="row" |United ArabEmirates
| Dirham
|-
! scope="row" |Indonesia
| Rupiah
|-
! scope="row" |Japan
| Yen
|-
! scope="row" |United States
| Dollar
|}
Additional notes
Legs 11 and 12 aired back-to-back as a special two-hour episode.

Reception

Critical response
The Amazing Race 23 received mixed reviews. Daniel Fienberg of HitFix wrote that it "was an average-to-slightly-below-average 'Amazing Race' season. There were some memorable moments and a few likable people, even if they were eliminated way too earlier. There’s a version of this season in which Chester & Ephraim and Brandon & Adam make it way, way further and the season ends up much more enjoyable. But there were some good locations and I personally got a kick out of all of the travel wackiness in the first handful of episodes." Michael Hewitt of the Orange County Register called it "one of its least-ambitious seasons". In 2016, this season was ranked 15th out of the first 27 seasons by the Rob Has a Podcast Amazing Race correspondents. Kareem Gantt of Screen Rant wrote that "Season 23 had a great cast and went to some truly stunning places in countries such as Chile and Indonesia. Season 23 proved that you can't judge a season just by its cover."

Ratings
U.S. Nielsen ratings

Episode 1, "We're Not in Oklahoma No More", aired at 8:12 p.m. Eastern / 7:12 p.m. Central in some markets due to the NFL on CBS.
Episode 2, "Zip It, Bingo", aired at 8:44 p.m. Eastern / 7:44 p.m. Central due to the NFL on CBS.
Episode 4, "Beards in the Wind", aired at 8:42 p.m. Eastern / 7:42 p.m. Central in some markets due to the NFL on CBS.
Episode 5, "Get Our Groove On", aired at 8:08 or 8:36 p.m. Eastern / 7:08 or 7:36 p.m. Central in some markets due to the NFL on CBS.
Episode 6, "Choir Boy at Heart", aired at 8:59 p.m. Eastern / 7:59 p.m. Central due to the NFL on CBS.
Episode 7, "Speed Dating Is the Worst", aired at 8:46 p.m. Eastern / 7:46 p.m. Central due to the NFL on CBS.
Episode 8, "One Hot Camel", aired at 8:08 p.m. Eastern / 7:08 p.m. Central in some markets due to the NFL on CBS.
Episode 9, "Part Like the Red Sea" went up against the 2013 American Music Awards; the episode aired at 8:10 p.m. Eastern / 7:10 p.m. Central in some markets due to the NFL on CBS.
Episode 10, "Cobra in My Teeth", aired at 8:51 p.m. Eastern / 7:51 p.m. Central due to the NFL on CBS.
Episode 11, "Amazing Crazy Race", aired at 8:27 p.m. Eastern / 7:27 p.m. Central in some markets due to the NFL on CBS.

Canadian ratings
Canadian broadcaster CTV also airs The Amazing Race on Sundays. Episodes air at 8:00 p.m. Eastern, Central and Pacific (9:00 p.m. Mountain and Atlantic) with one exception: Episode nine aired two hours earlier than its normal start time due to CTV's broadcast of the 2013 American Music Awards.

Episode 3, "King Arthur Style", aired on the Sunday before Canadian Thanksgiving Day.
Episode 9, "Part Like the Red Sea", aired on the day of the 101st Grey Cup.

References

External links
 Official website

 23
2013 American television seasons
Television shows filmed in Santa Clarita, California
Television shows filmed in Los Angeles
Television shows filmed in Chile
Television shows filmed in Argentina
Television shows filmed in São Paulo (state)
Television shows filmed in Spain
Television shows filmed in England
Television shows filmed in Portugal
Television shows filmed in Norway
Television shows filmed in Poland
Television shows filmed in Austria
Television shows filmed in the United Arab Emirates
Television shows filmed in Indonesia
Television shows filmed in Singapore
Television shows filmed in Japan
Television shows filmed in Alaska